Palamós Club de Futbol, S.A.D. is a Spanish football team based in Palamós, a town and commercial port in the Costa Brava, in the autonomous community of Catalonia. Founded in the late 19th century, it currently plays in Tercera División – Group 5, holding home matches at Estadi Palamós Costa Brava, with a 5,824-seat capacity.

History
The oldest club in Catalonia and the one of oldest in the country, Palamós was born in 1898, founded by Gaspar Matas i Danés who had studied in England, as Palamós Foot-Ball Club. The club changed its name several times in its beginnings: in 1926 it became Palamós Sport Club, being renamed Palamós Club de Fútbol 15 years later.

By 1954, it changed names again, now for Palamós Sociedad Cultural; it did not play any official competition for the following six years. In 1973, in the 75th anniversary of football in the city, the Royal Spanish Football Federation allowed the club to recapture the name Palamós CF.

In 1989–90, Palamós made its Segunda División débuts, and managed to go into the final rounds with a chance for top level promotion. In spite of its modesty, the side managed a further five seasons in level two, after which it relegated in 1995 to the fourth division - two in the same year due to financial irregularities.

11 years after Ukrainian-American businessman Dmitry Piterman had bought the club, saving it from certain bankruptcy, Palamós returned to Segunda División B in 2002, but only lasted two seasons.

Season to season

6 seasons in Segunda División
4 seasons in Segunda División B
20 seasons in Tercera División

Honours
Catalonia Cup: 1992
Third Division: 1988–89
Fourth Division: 1987–88, 1996–97, 2001–02

Current squad
The numbers are established according to the official website:

}

Famous players
 Carlos Alfaro Moreno
 Antoni Lima
  Juan Epitié
  Vladislav Lemish
 Jordi Condom
 Juan Carlos Rojo

References

External links

Futbolme team profile 
Penya Sport, fansite 
Penya Barnagroga, fansite 
Unofficial website 

 
Football clubs in Catalonia
Association football clubs established in 1898
1898 establishments in Spain
Segunda División clubs